Kolby Listenbee (born January 25, 1994) is a  former American football wide receiver. He was drafted by the Buffalo Bills in the sixth round of the 2016 NFL Draft. He played college football at TCU.

Early years
Listenbee attended Bowie High School in Arlington, Texas. He played quarterback for the Volunteers football team. He committed to Texas Christian University (TCU) to play college football.

College career
Listenbee played in 16 games his first two years at TCU (2012-2013) and had three receptions for 82 yards. As a junior in 2014, he became a starter and had 41 receptions for 753 yards and four touchdowns. As a senior in 2015, he had 30 receptions for 597 yards and five touchdowns. Listenbee also ran track at TCU.

Professional career
On December 1, 2015, it was announced that Listenbee had accepted an invitation to play in the 2016 Senior Bowl. On January 26, 2016, it was reported Listenbee would be unable to play in the Senior Bowl and he was replaced by Clemson's Charone Peake. Listenbee was one of 43 collegiate wide receivers invited to the NFL Scouting Combine in Indianapolis, Indiana. He performed the majority of drills, but was unable to perform the short shuttle or three-cone drill after suffering an apparent groin injury. His overall performance was well received by scouts and analysts, as Listenbee ran the second fastest 40-yard dash among all players, only behind Notre Dame wide receiver Will Fuller. On March 31, 2016, he attended TCU's pro day, along with Trevone Boykin, Josh Doctson, Derrick Kindred, Halapoulivaati Vaitai, Aaron Green, Jaden Oberkrom, and 13 others. Scouts and team representatives from 30 NFL teams attended, including Minnesota Vikings' head coach Mike Zimmer, Vikings' General Manager Rick Spielman, Los Angeles Rams' General Manager Les Snead, and wide receiver coaches from the Oakland Raiders and Dallas Cowboys. Listenbee  only performed 18 reps in the bench press, due to a sports hernia injury. At the conclusion of the pre-draft process, Listenbee was projected to be a third or fourth round pick by NFL draft experts an scouts. He was ranked the 11th best wide receiver in the draft by NFLDraftScout.com.

Buffalo Bills
The Buffalo Bills selected Listenbee in the sixth round (192nd overall) of the 2016 NFL Draft. He was the 23rd wide receiver selected in 2016. 

On May 12, 2016, the Buffalo Bills signed Listenbee to a four-year, $2.47 million contract with a signing bonus of $99,699.

Throughout training camp, Listenbee competed for a roster spot against Greg Salas, Marcus Easley, Dezmin Lewis, Leonard Hankerson, Greg Little, Jarrett Boykin, Walter Powell, Davonte Allen, and Gary Chambers. On August 30, 2016, Listenbee was placed on the reserve/non-football injury list coming off of surgery.

On June 6, 2017, Listenbee was waived by the Bills due to persistent injury concerns.

Miami Dolphins
On October 3, 2017, Listenbee was signed to the Miami Dolphins' practice squad. He was released on December 5, 2017.

Indianapolis Colts
On December 13, 2017, Listenbee was signed to the Indianapolis Colts' practice squad. He signed a reserve/future contract with the Colts on January 1, 2018. He was waived/injured by the Colts on May 18, 2018 and was placed on injured reserve. He was released on June 7, 2018.

References

External links
TCU Horned Frogs bio

1994 births
Living people
Sportspeople from Arlington, Texas
Players of American football from Texas
American football wide receivers
TCU Horned Frogs football players
Buffalo Bills players
Miami Dolphins players
Indianapolis Colts players